John Causer Preece (30 April 1914 – 5 July 2003) was an English professional footballer who played as a right back.

Career
Born in Wolverhampton, Preece spent his early career with Sunbeam Motors, Wolverhampton Wanderers, Willenhall Town and Bristol Rovers. He joined Bradford City in July 1938, making 3 league appearances for the club, before moving to Southport in May 1939. At Southport he made 36 league appearances between 1939 and 1947. He later played for Swindon Town and Chippenham United. At Swindon he made 7 league appearances between June 1947 and 1948.

Sources

References

1914 births
2003 deaths
English footballers
Wolverhampton Wanderers F.C. players
Willenhall Town F.C. players
Bristol Rovers F.C. players
Bradford City A.F.C. players
Southport F.C. players
Swindon Town F.C. players
Chippenham United F.C. players
English Football League players
Association football fullbacks